Bathycheilus is a genus of trilobites in the order Phacopida. It was described by Holub in 1908.

Species
 Bathycheilus castilianus Hammann, 1983
 Bathycheilus gallica Dean, 1965
 Bathycheilus galticus Dean, 1965
 Bathycheilus perplexus (Barrande, 1872)
 Bathycheilus sinensis Chen & Zhou, 2002

References

External links
 Bathycheilus at the Paleobiology Database

Ordovician trilobites of Europe
Bathycheilidae
Phacopida genera
Fossil taxa described in 1908